Khaad is a 2014 Indian Bengali film directed by Kaushik Ganguly. It's about a story of a group of people trying to make-out alive of a situation that tests their strength, patience and resilience.

Story 
Because of a taxi strike, a group of tourists, mostly unrelated to each other, get stuck in New Mal Junction. These people are honeymooners (Saheb and Mimi), family vacationers (Pallavi Chatterjee, Koushik Banerjee, Tridha Choudhury), an ailing mother and her son (Lily Chakraborty, Kaushik Ganguly), a priest (Ardhendu Banerjee), an actress and her mentally challenged brother (Gargi Roy Choudhury, Rajdeep Ghosh), one trekker (Kamaleshwar Mukherjee), a bus conductor (Rudranil), and a retired teacher (Maasud Akthar). One of the tourists, the priest manages to  arrange  a bus from the church for them to reach North Bengal. The other tourists also join him in the bus trip, but unfortunately the bus meets with a terrible accident. It falls off a cliff into an abyss, but the tourists survive with minor injuries. Injured and traumatized, they realize that they have become completely detached from any form of human contact. It was also not possible to climb 400–500 ft so easily during the daylight hours that were remaining that day. So they decide to spend that night there and think they will try to find another way out the next day. While spending that night, they decide to play a game. The priest suggests a game which is to reveal everyone's secret or anything that the person wants to confess to the world but never gathered courage. This secret is to be left behind in the abyss and from the next day, they could begin afresh.  Everyone agrees.  Gradually, the situation starts to change while the game progresses.  Everyone's darkest secrets are revealed one by one. This goes on until the wee hours of the night.Finally, we discover that all the tourists had died in the tragic accident.

Cast 
 Pallavi Chatterjee as Shiuli Jana, Meghna's mother
 Ardhendu Banerjee as Church Father
 Lily Chakravarty as Sabita, Khokan's mother
 Rudranil Ghosh as Paltan
 Gargi Roychowdhury as Aparna Banerjee
 Kaushik Ganguly as Khokan
 Bharat Kaul as Sidhartha, Doctor
 Saheb Bhattacharya as Jeet, Punam's husband
 Mimi Chakraborty as Punam
 Tanushree Chakraborty as Moumita Paul
 Tridha Choudhury as Meghna
 Kamaleswar Mukherjee as Rajib, Trekker
 Kaushik Banerjee as Mohan Jana, Shiuli's Husband
 Rajdeep Ghosh as Avik, Aparna's Brother
 Maasud Akthar as Tiwari Ji
 Ankita Mazumder 
 Praytay Basu as Tito, Meghna's brother

Soundtrack

References

External links 

Bengali-language Indian films
2010s Bengali-language films
2014 films
Films about death
Films about the afterlife
Films set in West Bengal
Films directed by Kaushik Ganguly
Films scored by Indradeep Dasgupta